Brannoch may refer to;

 Brannoch Castle and Brannoch Castle Town, locations in the game Quest 64
 Brannoch the Black, a Daemonite in the Wildstorm comic books and adversary of Lord Emp
 Brannoch, a brand owned by Hartmarx

See also

 Brannock (disambiguation)